Frafraha is a town in the Adenta Municipality in the Greater Accra Region of Ghana .

Location 
The town is located along the Adenta - Dodowa Road. It  distance by road from Kotoka International Airport is 11.1 kilometers (7.52 miles).

Politics 
Frafraha is in the Adenta Constituency  led by Hon. Adamu Ramadan. He succeeded Hon.  Yaw Buabeng Asamoah of the New Patriotic Party.

Infrastructure 
In 2016, Frafraha Community Day Senior High School was inaugurated by former president John Mahama to enroll over 500 students. The town also has the Frafraha Health Centre.

References 

Greater Accra Region